CHV or Chv may refer to:

Canine hepacivirus
Chattahoochee Valley Railway
Chilevisión, a Chilean television channel
Crypohnectria hypovirus, a species of the genus Hypovirus
Chuvash language, by ISO 639 code

See also
Channel V